Genista pilosa, commonly known as hairy greenweed, silkyleaf broom, silkyleaf woadwaxen and creeping broom, is a plant species in the genus Genista. It has yellowish coloured flowers which grow in 1-3 pairs. It grows in western and central Europe in poor, dry, sandy, and stony soils.

References

External links
 
 Genista pilosa 'Vancouver Gold'
 
 Genista pilosa

pilosa
Plants described in 1753
Flora of Europe
Taxa named by Carl Linnaeus